The following is a list of the 23 cantons of the Aveyron department, in France, following the French canton reorganisation which came into effect in March 2015:

 Aubrac et Carladez
 Aveyron et Tarn
 Causse-Comtal
 Causses-Rougiers
 Ceor-Ségala
 Enne et Alzou
 Lot et Dourdou
 Lot et Montbazinois
 Lot et Palanges
 Lot et Truyère
 Millau-1
 Millau-2
 Monts du Réquistanais
 Nord-Lévezou
 Raspes et Lévezou
 Rodez-1
 Rodez-2
 Rodez-Onet
 Saint-Affrique
 Tarn et Causses
 Vallon
 Villefranche-de-Rouergue
 Villeneuvois et Villefranchois

References